Orsodacne is a genus of beetles, the sole member of the subfamily Orsodacninae. It comprises four Holarctic species.

List of species
Orsodacne atra
Orsodacne cerasi
Orsodacne humeralis
Orsodacne lineola

References

Chrysomeloidea genera
Orsodacnidae